Little Lord Fauntleroy is a 1980 British family film directed by Jack Gold and starring Alec Guinness, Rick Schroder, Eric Porter, Connie Booth, and Colin Blakely. It is based on the 1886 children's novel of the same name by Frances Hodgson Burnett.

Plot synopsis
Young Cedric 'Ceddie' Errol and his widowed mother live in genteel poverty in 1870s New York after the death of his father. He was the favorite son of Cedric's grandfather, the Earl of Dorincourt, because the other two were wastrels and weaklings. But the Earl has long ago disowned his son for marrying outside the aristocracy. Cedric's two best friends were Mr. Hobbs the grocer (a Democrat and anti-aristocrat) and Dick Tipton the bootblack.

After his other two sons die, leaving Cedric the heir apparent to the earldom, Lord Dorincourt sends Mr. Havisham, his lawyer, to America to bring Cedric to Britain. Havisham is authorized to buy expensive gifts for Cedric, but the boy chooses to buy an engraved gold watch for Hobbs and enable Dick to buy out his drunken partner.

Mrs. Errol accompanies her son, but is not allowed to live at Dorincourt castle nor meet the Earl, although she will receive a house and a large allowance. She does not tell Cedric of his grandfather's bigotry. The Earl's lawyer is impressed with the young widow's dignity and intelligence, especially after she begins to take care of the poor living on the land.
 
Cedric is most grateful that his grandfather, albeit unintentionally, enabled him to help his friends, and thinks he is a kind man. This soon wins the heart of his stern grandfather. All his tenants and nearby villagers are also taken by him, especially as he inspires his grandfather to be more caring about his tenants. Slowly thawing, the Earl hosts a grand party to proudly introduce his grandson to British society, notably his formerly estranged sister, Lady Constantia Lorridaile. Lady Constantia is impressed with both Cedric and his mother.

After the party, Havisham tells the Earl that Cedric may not be the heir. An American dancer calling herself Minna Errol has approached him, insisting that her son Tom is the offspring of her late husband, the Earl's second son, Bevis. Heartbroken, the Earl is forced to accept her apparently valid claim. Minna proves to be uneducated and openly mercenary.

However, Dick recognizes Minna from her newspaper picture, as the former wife of his brother Ben, Tom's real father. They travel to the United Kingdom, confront Minna and thus disprove her claim.

The overjoyed Earl apologizes to Cedric's mother and brings her to live with the delighted Cedric on his estate. The small family has a festive Christmas dinner with all their friends and servants.

Cast

 Rick Schroder as Cedric Errol, Lord Fauntleroy
 Alec Guinness as John Arthur Molyneux Errol, Earl of Dorincourt
 Connie Booth as Mrs. Errol, Cedric's mother
 Eric Porter as  Mr. Havisham, Dorincourt's solicitor
 Colin Blakely as Silas Hobbs, Cedric's friend
 Rachel Kempson as Lady Lorradaile, Dorincourt's sister
 Carmel McSharry as Mary, Mrs. Errol's substantive
 Antonia Pemberton as Dawson, Dorincourt's head housekeeper
 Rolf Saxon as  Dick Tipton, Cedric's friend
 John Cater as Thomas, the Butler
 Peter Copley as Reverend Muldaur
 Patsy Rowlands as  Mrs. Dibble
 Ann Way as Miss Smiff, the village dressmaker
 Patrick Stewart as Wilkins, the riding teacher
 Gerry Cowper as Mellon, the room service
 Edward Wiley as Ben Tipton
 Kate Harper as Minna Tipton
 Tony Melody as Mr. Kimsey
 Rohan McCullough as Lady Grace
 Dicon Murray as Georgie
 Ballard Berkeley as Sir Harry Lorradaile
 John Southworth as Higgins
 Norman Pitt as Lord Ashbey Delefante
 Bill Nighy as an Officer (uncredited)

Production
Most of the $6 million budget came from International Telephone and Telegraph. Rosemont said: "What people remember about the 1936 version was Freddie Bartholomew. But Bartholomew was British and the whole point about the story is that the boy who inherits the English earldom isn't English at all but a kid from the Lower East Side of New York. So, we open our film with him playing in Hester Street (actually shot in London) and then some 20 pages into the script we take him to England and the castle where he meets for the first time his cantankerous grandfather, the earl...  What we do is point up the contrast and dramatize the difference in background and style of living".

Distribution 
Little Lord Fauntleroy had its world premiere on television in the United States on 25 November 1980 on CBS and was then released in cinemas in the United Kingdom in December, and a German-dubbed version was first screened in West Germany on 26 December 1982. The film has since become a Christmas classic in Germany, and is broadcast on the national broadcast network Das Erste every year.

See also
 Little Lord Fauntleroy (1921)
 Little Lord Fauntleroy (1936)
 Little Lord Fauntleroy, the book

References

External links
 

1980 films
British drama films
Films directed by Jack Gold
Films based on works by Frances Hodgson Burnett
Films based on American novels
Films based on British novels
Films set in the 1880s
1980s English-language films
1980s British films